Narayan Dutt Sharma (born 15 December 1972) is an Indian politician and a member of the Sixth Legislative Assembly of Delhi in India. He represents the Badarpur constituency of New Delhi.

Early life and education
Narayan  Dutt Sharma was born in Mathura district. He has received education till twelfth grade.

Political career
Narayan Dutt Sharma has been a MLA for one term. He represented the Badarpur constituency and is a member of the Aam Aadmi Party political party. Prior to this, he had contested from the same constituency in the year 2013 but had lost the election to Ramvir Singh Bidhuri.

Posts held

See also
Aam Aadmi Party
Delhi Legislative Assembly
Politics of India
Rithala (Delhi Assembly constituency)
Sixth Legislative Assembly of Delhi

References

1972 births
Aam Aadmi Party politicians from Delhi
Delhi MLAs 2015–2020
Living people
People from North West Delhi district
Bahujan Samaj Party politicians